Esztergom is a district in north-eastern part of Komárom-Esztergom County. Esztergom is also the name of the town where the district seat is found. The district is located in the Central Transdanubia Statistical Region.

Geography 
Esztergom District borders with the Slovakian region of Nitra to the north, Szob District and Szentendre District (Pest County) to the east, Pilisvörösvár District (Pest County) to the southeast, Tatabánya District to the southwest, Tata District to the west. The number of the inhabited places in Esztergom District is 24.

Municipalities 
The district has 5 towns, 1 large village and 18 villages.
(ordered alphabetically, as of 1 January 2013)

The bolded municipalities are cities, italics municipality is large village.

Demographics

In 2011, it had a population of 93,784 and the population density was 175/km².

Ethnicity
Besides the Hungarian majority, the main minorities are the German (approx. 4,200), Slovak (2,250), Roma (1,600) and Romanian (300).

Total population (2011 census): 93,784

Ethnic groups (2011 census):
Hungarians: 79,701 (89.61%)
Germans: 4,177 (4.69%)
Slovaks: 2,254 (2.53%)
Gypsies: 1,601 (1.80%)
Others and indefinable: 1,209 (1.36%)
Did not declare their ethnic group: approx. 5,000

Religion
Religious adherence in the county according to 2011 census:

Catholic – 42,934 (Roman Catholic – 42,524; Greek Catholic – 396);
Reformed – 6,018;
Evangelical – 555; 
other religions – 1,423; 
Non-religious – 14,400; 
Atheism – 1,127;
Undeclared – 27,327.

See also
List of cities and towns in Hungary

References

External links
 Postal codes of the Esztergom District

Districts in Komárom-Esztergom County